Benjamin Keith Marsh (born 9 July 1976) is a former Australian rules footballer who played with  and  in the Australian Football League (AFL).

Marsh remained with the Crows for another five seasons before being delisted at the end of 2003. He was then picked up in the 2004 pre-season draft by Richmond where he would add a further 7 games and one goal to his tally before retiring at the end of 2004.

Statistics

|- style="background-color: #EAEAEA"
|style="text-align:center;background:#afe6ba;"|1998†
|
| 31 || 9 || 4 || 3 || 26 || 20 || 46 || 20 || 1 || 70 || 0.4 || 0.3 || 2.9 || 2.2 || 5.1 || 2.2 || 0.1 || 7.8
|-
! scope="row" style="text-align:center;" | 1999
|
| 31 || 1 || 0 || 0 || 0 || 1 || 1 || 0 || 0 || 0 || 0.0 || 0.0 || 0.0 || 1.0 || 1.0 || 0.0 || 0.0 || 0.0
|- style="background-color: #EAEAEA"
! scope="row" style="text-align:center" | 2000
|
| 31 || 12 || 5 || 7 || 48 || 37 || 85 || 35 || 9 || 120 || 0.4 || 0.6 || 4.0 || 3.1 || 7.1 || 2.9 || 0.8 || 10.0
|-
! scope="row" style="text-align:center" | 2001
|
| 31 || 18 || 7 || 7 || 78 || 57 || 135 || 40 || 15 || 187 || 0.4 || 0.4 || 4.3 || 3.2 || 7.5 || 2.2 || 0.8 || 10.4
|- style="background-color: #EAEAEA"
! scope="row" style="text-align:center" | 2002
|
| 31 || 6 || 1 || 0 || 20 || 14 || 34 || 9 || 7 || 50 || 0.2 || 0.0 || 3.3 || 2.3 || 5.7 || 1.5 || 1.2 || 8.3
|-
! scope="row" style="text-align:center" | 2003
|
| 31 || 2 || 0 || 1 || 2 || 0 || 2 || 2 || 0 || 15 || 0.0 || 0.5 || 1.0 || 0.0 || 1.0 || 1.0 || 0.0 || 7.5
|- style="background-color: #EAEAEA"
! scope="row" style="text-align:center" | 2004
|
| 15 || 7 || 1 || 0 || 19 || 24 || 43 || 16 || 5 || 73 || 0.1 || 0.0 || 2.7 || 3.4 || 6.1 || 2.3 || 0.7 || 10.4
|- class="sortbottom"
! colspan=3| Career
! 55
! 18
! 18
! 193
! 153
! 346
! 122
! 37
! 515
! 0.3
! 0.3
! 3.5
! 2.8
! 6.3
! 2.2
! 0.7
! 9.4
|}

References

External links

1976 births
Living people
Adelaide Football Club players
Adelaide Football Club Premiership players
Richmond Football Club players
West Adelaide Football Club players
Australian rules footballers from South Australia
Flagstaff Hill Football Club players
One-time VFL/AFL Premiership players